Jim Northrup may refer to:

Jim Northrup (baseball) (1939–2011), Major League Baseball outfielder
Jim Northrup (writer) (1943–2016), Ojibwa author and humorist